Mount Vernon Cemetery may refer to various burial locations, including:

 Mount Vernon Cemetery (Philadelphia)
 Mount Vernon Cemetery (West Boylston, Massachusetts)